The Lahun Mathematical Papyri (also known as the Kahun Mathematical Papyri) is an ancient Egyptian mathematical text. It forms part of the Kahun Papyri, which was discovered at El-Lahun (also known as Lahun, Kahun or Il-Lahun) by Flinders Petrie during excavations of a workers' town near the pyramid of the 12th dynasty pharaoh Sesostris II. The Kahun Papyri are a collection of texts including administrative texts, medical texts, veterinarian texts and six fragments devoted to mathematics.

Fragments
The mathematical texts most commented on are usually named:
 Lahun IV.2 (or Kahun IV.2) (UC 32159): This fragment contains a table of Egyptian fraction representations of numbers of the form 2/n. A more complete version of this table of fractions is given in the Rhind Mathematical Papyrus.
 Lahun IV.3 (or Kahun IV.3) (UC 32160) contains numbers in arithmetical progression and a problem very much like problem 40 of the Rhind Mathematical Papyrus. Another problem on this fragment computes the volume of a cylindrical granary. In this problem the scribe uses a formula which takes measurements in cubits and computes the volume and expresses it in terms of the unit khar. Given the diameter (d) and height (h) of the cylindrical granary:
.
 In modern mathematical notation this is equal to
 (measured in khar).
 This problem resembles problem 42 of the Rhind Mathematical Papyrus. The formula is equivalent to  measured in cubic-cubits as used in the other problems.
 Lahun XLV.1 (or Kahun XLV.1) (UC 32161) contains a group of very large numbers (hundreds of thousands).
 Lahun LV.3 (or Kahun LV.3) (UC 32134A and UC 32134B) contains a so-called aha problem which asks one to solve for a certain quantity. The problem resembles ones from the Rhind Mathematical Papyrus (problems 24–29).
 Lahun LV.4 (or Kahun LV.4) (UC 32162) contains what seems to be an area computation and a problem concerning the value of ducks, geese and cranes. The problem concerning fowl is a baku problem and most closely resembles problem 69 in the Rhind Mathematical Papyrus and problems 11 and 21 in the Moscow Mathematical Papyrus.
 Unnamed fragment (UC 32118B). This is a fragmentary piece.

2/n tables
The Lahun papyrus IV.2 reports a 2/n table for odd n, n = 1, , 21. The Rhind Mathematical Papyrus reports an odd n table up to 101. These fraction tables were related to multiplication problems and the use of unit fractions, namely n/p scaled by LCM m to mn/mp. With the exception of 2/3, all fractions were represented as sums of unit fractions (i.e. of the form 1/n), first in red numbers. Multiplication algorithms and scaling factors involved repeated doubling of numbers, and other operations. Doubling a unit fraction with an even denominator was simple, divided the denominator by 2. Doubling a fraction with an odd denominator however results in a fraction of the form 2/n. The RMP 2/n table and RMP 36 rules allowed scribes to find decompositions of 2/n into unit fractions for specific needs, most often to solve otherwise un-scalable rational numbers (i.e. 28/97 in RMP 31, and 30/53 n RMP 36 by substituting 26/97 + 2/97 and 28/53 + 2/53) and generally n/p by (n - 2) /p + 2/p. Decompositions were unique. Red auxiliary numbers selected divisors of denominators mp that best summed to numerator mn.

See also
 List of ancient Egyptian papyri

References

External links
John Legon: A Kahun Mathematical Fragment 
History of Egyptian fractions
Medical Papyrus, UCL website
The Kahun Gynaecological Papyrus

Egyptian mathematics
Egyptian fractions
Egyptian papyri
Mathematics manuscripts

de:Medizinische Papyri aus Lahun
es:Papiro Kahun
fr:Papyrus Kahun
sv:Kahun-papyrusen